José Erasmo Vera Ulloa (13 March 1923 – 16 August 1989) was a Chilean footballer. He played in nine matches for the Chile national football team in 1945 and 1946. He was also part of Chile's squad for the 1945 South American Championship.

References

External links
 

1923 births
1989 deaths
Chilean footballers
Chile international footballers
Place of birth missing
Association football forwards
Santiago Morning footballers
Colo-Colo footballers